Elante mall ( Nexus Malls ) is a shopping mall in the city of Chandigarh in India. Elante is spread over an area of 20 acres. It is part of a mixed use real estate development project by Larsen & Toubro called Elante.

Features.

Elante Mall has a retail space area of over 1 million square feet. It has 2 main gates, one is on the big front entry and another one is on the back. It has 3 basement levels, a ground level and three upper levels. In the retail area, Elante Mall hosts retailers of various Indian and international brands, a food court and a courtyard full of cafes. The Mall has an 8-screen Multiplex of PVR Cinemas. On its top floor, the mall has restaurants, fast food joints and a Fun City for kids entertainment.
In 2013, the mall was found to be burning 6000 litres of diesel daily due to a lack of electricity connection to the grid. The mall requires a 15MW power supply.

Acquisition deals
In September 2015, Mumbai-based Carnival Group bought Elante Mall, at a price of Rs 1,785 crore (more than US$ 274 million) making it one of the biggest deal for a single real estate or property in India at the time.

On 28 July 2017, Nexus Malls, a subsidiary of US-based global investment firm The Blackstone Group bought Elante Mall for an undisclosed amount. This is the second time Elante Mall is sold in two years.

See also
 Larsen & Toubro
 L&T Realty

References

Shopping malls in Chandigarh
2013 establishments in Chandigarh
Shopping malls established in 2013
Elante Mall Chandigarh: Entertainment Overloaded At City’s Biggest Mall